Mossley Football Club, formerly Mossley Young Men, is a Northern Irish, intermediate football club playing in Division 1B of the Northern Amateur Football League. The club is based in Newtownabbey, County Antrim, and was formed in 1949. The club plays in the Irish Cup.

References

External links
 Club website

Association football clubs in Northern Ireland
Association football clubs established in 1949
Association football clubs in County Antrim
Northern Amateur Football League clubs
1949 establishments in Northern Ireland